Inside the Osmonds is a 2001 ABC-TV movie about the personal lives and professional careers of The Osmonds, and how the stresses and strains of their careers and the turbulent 1970s and 1980s affected their relationships with each other and their families. The ending that takes place in January 2001 features a special appearance by the real Osmonds.

Inside the Osmonds was the second biopic of the Osmond family, following 19 years after the 1982 film Side by Side: The True Story of the Osmond Family, which had focused on the family's earlier years.

Main cast
 Bruce McGill — George Osmond
 Veronica Cartwright — Olive Osmond
Milton Bruchanski — Virl Osmond
Shane Davison — Tom Osmond
 Joel Berti — Alan Osmond
Jason Knight — Wayne Osmond
Ryan G. Kirkpatrick — Merrill Osmond
 Miklos Perlus — Jay Osmond
 Thomas Dekker — Donny Osmond (younger)
 Patrick Levis — Donny Osmond (older)
Taylin Wilson — Marie Osmond (younger)
 Janaya Stephens — Marie Osmond (older)
Taylor Abrahamese — Jimmy Osmond (younger)
 Trevor Blumas — Jimmy Osmond (older)
Tammy Gillis — Mary Osmond (Merrill's wife)

External links

2001 television films
2001 films
American biographical films
American Broadcasting Company original programming
Biographical films about entertainers
Films directed by Neill Fearnley
Films set in the 1970s
Films set in the 1980s
Osmond family (show business)
American television films
2000s American films